Aristaea pavoniella is a moth of the family Gracillariidae. It is found from Germany and Poland to Italy, as well as central and southern Russia.

The wingspan is 8–10 mm.

The larvae feed on Aster alpinus, Aster amellus and Aster bellidiastrum. They mine the leaves of their host plant. The mine starts with a very shallow lower-surface corridor, continuing as a large full depth tentiform mine. The upper surface shows a distinct keel. Within this keel the larva spins a cocoon, in which it retires during feeding pauses. Pupation takes place outside of the mine.

References

Aristaea
Moths of Japan
Moths of Europe
Moths described in 1847